Legionella gresilensis is a Gram-negative, aerobic, catalase-positive, non-spore-forming bacterium with a polar flagellum from the genus Legionella which was isolated from a shower from thermal spa water in the city Gréoux-les-Bains.

References

External links
Type strain of Legionella gresilensis at BacDive -  the Bacterial Diversity Metadatabase

Legionellales
Bacteria described in 2001